The Paradox of American Power is a book written by political scientist Joseph Nye and published in 2002.

According to Nye, a nation has never had as much cultural, economic, and military power as currently wields the United States of America.  Yet, at the same time, a nation has never been so interdependent with the rest of the world.  Nye describes "hard" and "soft" power and asserts that maintaining and maximizing soft power is fundamental  to keeping the U.S. the worldwide leader.  Nye asserts that China, Japan, India, Russia, and the European Union have the pre-conditions necessary to be superpowers.

Nye also writes about humanitarian intervention in conflicts around the world, the multilateralism and unilateralism and the American public opinion engagement in U.S. foreign policy. Nye attempts to prove that America requires, not only hard, but also soft power in order to maintain a position in global affairs. 

Non-fiction books about diplomacy